Mongi Kooli (March 15, 1930 – June 14, 2018) was a Tunisian politician and diplomat. He joined the Socialist Destourian Party. He was the governor of the Jendouba Governorate and the Bizerte Governorate. He was the Tunisian Ambassador to Spain and Czechoslovakia. He was the Tunisian Health Minister in 1976–1977. He authored a 2012 memoir, Au Service de la République.

References

1930 births
2018 deaths
Socialist Destourian Party politicians
Health ministers of Tunisia
Ambassadors of Tunisia to Spain
Ambassadors of Tunisia to Czechoslovakia
People from Monastir Governorate